Sergey Vladimirovich Zastynchanu (born 1979), known as The Koptevsky Maniac is a Moldovan serial killer who operated mainly in the north of Moscow.

Biography 
He was born in 1980 in Moldova and grew up in the small town of Fălești, where he graduated from high school. In 1996, he was forced to leave for Russia to find work as a builder. On June 10, 2004, a 70-year-old woman and her sister were killed with a kitchen knife in their apartment in the Moscow district of Koptevo. A month later, a 69-year-old woman was killed in her apartment along Horoshevskoe highway. The attacker robbed one victim of 75 thousand rubles, and the other of 15 thousand rubles. Almost all the valuable items were left untouched, but it was later found that the killer only came for the money. Three months later, a criminal in the south-west of Moscow killed a single 67-year-old lady in her apartment. During the investigation it was revealed that the apartment had recently been repaired. Neighbors reported that a young man had been working on repairs there - a foreign worker from Moldova. The builders working with him later contacted him.

The criminal was detained and searched, during which 60 thousand rubles as well as jewelry were found on him. Under the weight of the evidence, Zastynchanu acknowledged his guilt. The forensic psychiatric examination showed that at the time of the murders, he was imputed and reported his actions. Zastynchanu demanded his case to be examined with the participation of the jury. The jury found him guilty of the murder of four people and robbery attacks. The jury found that the criminal does not deserve leniency. On June 7, 2005, the Moscow City Court found Sergey Zastynchanu guilty under articles 105 (murder of two or more persons) and 162 (robbery) of the Criminal Code of the Russian Federation and, on the basis of a combination of crimes, sentenced him to life imprisonment with a serving sentence in a correctional colony with a special regime. The Supreme Court of the Russian Federation left the verdict of the previous sentence unchanged.

See also
 List of Russian serial killers

Links 
 Гражданин Молдавии сел пожизненно за убийство четырёх женщин в Москве
 Приезжий из Молдавии убил четырёх москвичек
 Гастарбайтер получил пожизненное за убийство четырёх москвичек
 Серийный убийца Сергей Застынчану

1979 births
2004 murders in Russia
Living people
Male serial killers
Moldovan emigrants to Russia
Moldovan serial killers
Prisoners sentenced to life imprisonment by Russia